Sheridan Bridge is a two-lane steel Truss bridge carrying vehicular traffic in Sheridan, Oregon, United States. Construction began in 1938 and finished in 1939. This  bridge connects the northern and southern portions of the town across the South Yamhill River in Yamhill County.

History
Sheridan Bridge was built in 1938. It was a project of the Works Progress Administration during the Great Depression of the 1930s. When the new bridge was built, the older steel bridge was lifted up and moved down river a short distance. Mountain States Construction Company built the bridge for Yamhill County. In 2013, Wildish Standard Paving Company began repairs on the bridge that closed one lane during construction.  The Oregon Department of Transportation paid for the project that included a seismic retrofit, new paint, and resurfacing of the deck, among other improvements.

Location
The steel bridge carries Bridge Street across the South Yamhill River where the bridge's northern terminus is at the intersection with Oregon Route 18 Business (Main Street). Bridge Street then continues south to Oregon Route 18 where it ends just north of the Federal Correctional Institution, Sheridan. It is the only passenger bridge inside of town (there is a railroad bridge further upriver), and is maintained by Yamhill County. As of 2001 the bridge carries an average of 2,163 vehicles per-day on the two-lane structure in downtown Sheridan. In addition to one lane of traffic in each direction, the bridge has sidewalks on both sides.

References

External links 

Oregon Historic Sites Database
Picture of first steel bridge
Picture of first and second bridges together in 1938

Sheridan, Oregon
Works Progress Administration in Oregon
Bridges completed in 1939
Transportation buildings and structures in Yamhill County, Oregon
Road bridges in Oregon
1939 establishments in Oregon
Truss bridges in the United States
Steel bridges in the United States